Torry McTyer (born April 10, 1995) is an American football cornerback. He played college football at UNLV before signing with the Miami Dolphins as an undrafted free agent in 2017. McTyer has also been a member of the Kansas City Chiefs, Cincinnati Bengals, and Washington Football Team.

Early life and college
A three-star recruit, McTyer committed to UNLV to play college football over an offer from California. In 2016, he started 11 games at cornerback for UNLV and finished the season with 49 tackles, 15 passes defensed with 3 interceptions.

Professional career

Miami Dolphins
McTyer signed with the Miami Dolphins as an undrafted free agent on May 5, 2017. He was waived on August 31, 2019, .

Kansas City Chiefs
On September 3, 2019, McTyer signed with the Kansas City Chiefs' practice squad.

Cincinnati Bengals
On September 26, 2019, McTyer was signed by the Cincinnati Bengals off the Chiefs practice squad. He re-signed with the Bengals on March 23, 2020. He was waived on September 5, 2020, but re-signed with the team two days later. He was waived again on September 15 and re-signed to the practice squad the following day. McTyer was elevated to the active roster on October 3 and October 10 for the team's weeks 4 and 5 games against the Jacksonville Jaguars and Baltimore Ravens, and reverted to the practice squad after each game. He was placed on the practice squad/injured list on October 24. His practice squad contract expired after the season on January 11, 2021.

Washington Football Team
McTyer signed with the Washington Football Team on January 12, 2021. He got significant playing time in the Week 4 win against the Atlanta Falcons due to an injury to cornerback Benjamin St-Juste, but was injured on the last play of the game. McTyer was placed on injured reserve on October 5, 2021.

Personal life
McTyer is the son of former NFL cornerback Tim McTyer.

References

External links

UNLV Rebels bio

1995 births
Living people
American football cornerbacks
Cincinnati Bengals players
Kansas City Chiefs players
Miami Dolphins players
Players of American football from Los Angeles
UNLV Rebels football players
Washington Football Team players